This is a complete list of the Melody Maker number-one albums from 1958 to 1988.

Date, Title, Artist, Weeks at No1

1958 
8 November South Pacific (Soundtrack) 89

1960 
23 July Elvis Is Back (Elvis Presley) 6

3 September South Pacific (Soundtrack) 17

31 December G.I Blues (Elvis Presley) 29

1961 
22 July South Pacific (Soundtrack) 10

30 September The Shadows (Shadows) 6

11 November South Pacific (Soundtrack) 1

18 November Something For Everybody (Elvis Presley) 2

2 December The Shadows (Shadows) 1

9 December Something For Everybody (Elvis Presley) 1

16 December South Pacific (Soundtrack) 1

23 December Blue Hawaii (Elvis Presley) 4

1962 
20 January The Young Ones (Cliff Richard) 5

24 February Blue Hawaii (Elvis Presley) 1

3 March The Young Ones (Cliff Richard) 1

10 March Blue Hawaii (Elvis Presley) 15

23 June West Side Story (Soundtrack) 7

11 August Pot Luck (Elvis Presley) 3

1 September West Side Story (Soundtrack) 9

3 November Out of The Shadows (Shadows) 4

1 December West Side Story (Soundtrack) 2

15 December On Stage With the Black and White Minstrels (George Mitchell Minstrels) 4

1963 
12 January Out of The Shadows (Shadows) 2

26 January West Side Story (Soundtrack) 1

2 February Summer Holiday (Cliff Richard) 13

4 May Please Please Me (Beatles) 30

30 November With The Beatles (Beatles) 22

1964 
2 May Rolling Stones No1 (Rolling Stones) 11

18 July A Hard Day's Night (Beatles) 21

12 December Beatles For Sale (Beatles) 9

1965 
13 February Rolling Stones No2 (Rolling Stones) 10

24 April Beatles For Sale (Beatles) 6

5 June The Freewheelin' Bob Dylan (Bob Dylan) 1

12 June Bringing It All back Home (Bob Dylan) 1

19 June The Sound of Music (Soundtrack) 8

14 August Help (Beatles) 9

16 October Out of Our Heads (Rolling Stones) 1

23 October Help (Beatles) 6

27 November The Sound of Music (Soundtrack) 2

11 December Rubber Soul (Beatles) 13

1966 
12 March The Sound of Music (Soundtrack) 7

30 April Aftermath (Rolling Stones) 9

2 July The Sound of Music (Soundtrack) 6

13 August Revolver (Beatles) 9

15 October The Sound of Music (Soundtrack) 16

1967 
4 February Meet The Monkees (Monkees) 7

25 March The Sound of Music (Soundtrack) 4

22 April More of The Monkees (Monkees) 2

6 May The Sound of Music (Soundtrack) 4

3 June Sgt Peppers Lonely Hearts Club Band (Beatles) 22

4 November The Sound of Music (Soundtrack) 11

1968 
20 January Val Doonican Rocks-But Gently (Val Doonican) 2

3 February The Sound of Music (Soundtrack) 4  

2 March Diana Ross & Supremes Greatest Hits 2

16 March John Wesley Harding (Bob Dylan) 10

25 May This Is Soul (Various) 7

13 July Ogdens Nut Gone Flake (Small Faces) 5

17 August Delilah (Tom Jones) 1

24 August Bookends (Simon & Garfunkel) 5

28 September Hollies Greatest Hits (Hollies) 6

9 November Live At The Talk Of The Town (Seekers)1

16 November Hollies Greatest Hits (Hollies) 3

7 December The Beatles (Beatles) 11

1969 
22 February Diana Ross & Supremes, Join The Temptations 5

29 March Goodbye (Cream) 4

26 April Best of The seekers (Seekers) 1

3 May Goodbye (Cream) 1

10 May Best of The Seekers (Seekers) 1

17 May On The Threshold of A Dream (Moody Blues)1

24 May Nashville Skyline (Bob Dylan) 6

5 July This Is Tom Jones (Tom Jones) 2

19 July Flaming Star (Elvis Presley) 4

16 August Stand Up (Jethro Tull) 6

27 September Blind Faith (Blind Faith) 1

4 October Abbey Road (Beatles) 20

1970 
Date Title Artist weeks At No1

21 February Led Zeppelin II (Led Zeppelin) 2

7 March Bridge Over Troubled Water (Simon & Garfunkel) 13

6 June Let It Be (Beatles) 8

1 August Bridge Over Troubled Water (Simon & Garfunkel) 7

19 September A Question of Balance (Moody Blues)3

10 October Get Yer Ya Ya's Out! (Rolling stones)3

31 October Paranoid (Black Sabbath) 1

7 November Bridge Over Troubled Water (Simon & garfunkel) 1

14 November Paranoid (Black Sabbath) 1

21 November Led Zeppelin III (Led zeppelin) 7

1971 
Date Title Artist Weeks at No1

9 January Bridge Over Troubled Water (Simon & Garfunkel) 4

6 February All Things Must Pass (George Harrison)8

3 April Bridge Over Troubled Water (Simon & Garfunkel) 2

17 April Home Lovin' Man (Andy Williams) 4

15 May Tamla Mowtown Chartbusters Vol 2 (Various)1

22 May Sticky Fingers (Rolling Stones) 7

10 July Tarkus (Emerson Lake & Palmer) 1

17 July Ram (Paul & Linda McCartney) 1

24 July Bridge Over Troubled Water (Simon & Garfunkel) 1

31 July Ram (Paul & Linda McCartney) 1

7 August Bridge Over Troubled Water (Simon & Garfunkel) 1

14 August Ram (Paul & Linda McCartney) 1

21 August Every Good Boy Deserves Favour (Moody Blues) 4

18 September Every Picture Tells A Story (Rod Stewart) 1

25 September Tapestry (Carole King) 1

2 October Every Picture Tells A Story (Rod Stewart) 10

11 December Imagine (John Lennon) 4

1972 
Date Title Artist Weeks at No1

8 January Electric Warrior (T.Rex) 4

5 February Teaser and The Firecat (Cat Stevens) 1

12 February Electric Warrior (T.Rex) 3

4 March Teaser and The Firecat (Cat Stevens) 2

18 March Paul Simon (Paul Simon) 4

15 April Harvest (Neil Young) 7

3 June Bolan Boogie (T.Rex) 6

15 July American Pie (Don McClean) 3

5 August Simon & Garfunkel Greatest Hits (Simon & Garfunkel) 4

2 September Never A Dull Moment (Rod Stewart) 7

21 October Catch Bull At Four (Cat Stevens) 1

28 October Never A Dull Moment (Rod Stewart) 1

4 November Simon & Garfunkels Greatest Hits 3

25 November 20 All Time Greats of The 50's (Various) 1

2 December Back To Front (Gilbert O' Sullivan) 3

23 December 20 All time Greats of The 50's (Various) 2

1973 
6 January Slayed (Slade) 2

20 January Back To Front (Gilbert O' Sullivan) 3

10 February Slayed (Slade) 1

17 February No Secrets (Carly Simon) 1

24 February Don't Shoot! I'm Only The Piano Player (Elton John) 7

14 April Tanx (T.Rex) 1

21 April Billion Dollar Babies (Alice Cooper)1

28 April Houses of The Holy (Led Zeppelin)1

5 May Ooh! La-La! (Faces) 2

19 May Aladdin Sane (David Bowie)4

16 June * Aladdin Sane (David Bowie) & Beatles 1962 -1966 (Beatles) = 1

23 June Alladin Sane (David Bowie)2

7 July Beatles 1967-70 (Beatles)2

21 July Aladdin Sane (David Bowie) 3

11 August We Can Make It (Peters & Lee)

1 September Now and Then (Carpenters) 3

22 September Sing It Again Rod (Rod Stewart) 2

6 October Goats Head Soup (Rolling Stones) 3

27 October Sladest (Slade) 1

3 November Hello (Status Quo) 1

10 November Pin-Ups (David Bowie) 5

15 December Stranded (Roxy Music) 5

1974 
19 January Goodbye Yellow Brick Road (Elton John) 1

26 January Stranded (Roxy Music) 2

9 February The singles 1969-1973 (Carpenters) 17

8 June Journey To The Centre of The Earth (Rick Wakeman) 1

15 June Diamond Dogs (David Bowie) 4

13 July Tubular Bells (Mike Oldfield) 1

20 July The singles 1969-1973 (Carpenters) 1

27 July Tubular Bells (Mike Oldfield) 1

3 August Band On The Run (Wings) 6

14 September Tubular Bells (Mike Oldfield) 3

5 October Hergest Ridge (Mike Oldfield) 1

12 October Tubular Bells (Mike Oldfield) 3

2 November Smiler (Rod Stewart) 4

30 November Elton Johns Greatest Hits 12

1975 
22 February Tubular Bells (Mike Oldfield) 3

15 March Crime Of The Century (Supertramp) 1

22 March On The Level (Status Quo) 2

5 April Twenty Greatest Hits (Tom Jones) 1

12 April Physical Graffiti (Led Zeppelin) 1

19 April Twenty Greatest Hits (Tom Jones) 1

26 April Young Americans (David Bowie) 1

3 May Myths & Legends of King Arthur & Knights of The Round Table (Rick Wakeman) 1

10 May Once Upon A Star (Bay city Rollers) 5

14 June Best of The Stylistics 1

21 June Captain Fantastic and The Brown Dirt Cowboy (Elton John) 3

12 July Venus and Mars (Wings) 7

30 August Best of The Stylistics 1

6 September Atlantic Crossing (Rod Stewart) 9

8 November Wish You Were Here (Pink Floyd) 1

15 November Siren (Roxy Music) 1

22 November 40 Greatest Hits (Perry Como) 1

29 November Siren (Roxy Music) 1

6 December 40 Greatest Hits (Perry Como) 1

13 December Ommadawn (Mike Oldfield) 1

20 December A Night At The Opera (Queen) 9

1976 
21 February Desire (Bob Dylan) 1

28 February The Very Best of Slim Whitman (Slim Whitman) 4

27 March Carnival (Manual and The Music of The Mountains) 1

3 April Greatest Hits 1971-1975 (Eagles) 3

24 April Rock Follies (Soundtrack) 3

15 May Abba's Greatest Hits (Abba) 9

17 July A Night On The Town (Rod Stewart) 1

24 July 20 Golden Greats (Beach Boys) 11

9 October Abba's Greatest Hits (Abba) 4

6 November Songs In The Key Of Life (Stevie Wonder) 2

20 November The Song Remains The Same (Led Zeppelin) 1

27 November Songs In The Key Of Life (Stevie Wonder) 2

11 December 20 Golden Greats (Glenn Campbell) 1

18 December Arrival (Abba) 7

1977 
5 February Red River Valley (Slim Whitman) 1

12 February Songs In The Key Of Life (Stevie Wonder) 1

19 February Red River Valley (Slim Whitman) 1

26 February Evita (Various) 1

5 March 20 Golden Greats (Shadows) 5

9 April Portrait Of Sinatra (Frank Sinatra) 3

30 April Arrival (Abba) 4

28 May Hotel California (Eagles) 1

4 June Arrival (Abba) 2

18 June Hotel California (Eagles) 2

2 July A Star Is Born (Soundtrack) 1

9 July The Muppet Show (Muppets) 2

23 July A Star Is Born (Soundtrack) 1

30 July The Johnny Mathis Collection (Johnny Mathis) 1

6 August A Star Is Born (Soundtrack) 2

20 August Going For The One (Yes) 3

10 September Oxygene (Jean Michael Jarre) 3

1 October 20 Golden Greats (Diana Ross and The Supremes) 6

12 November 40 Golden Greats (Cliff Richard) 1

19 November Footloose and Fancy Free (Rod Stewart) 1

26 November The Sound of Bread (Bread) 10

1978 
4 February Rumours (Fleetwood Mac) 2

18 February The Album (Abba) 7

8 April 20 Golden Greats (Buddy Holly and The Crickets) 1

15 April The Kick Inside (Kate Bush) 1

22 April 20 Golden Greats (Nat King Cole) 1

29 April And Then There Were Three (Genesis) 1

6 May Saturday Night Fever (Bee Gees, Various, Soundtrack) 18

9 September Night Flight To Venus (Boney M) 4

7 October Grease (Soundtrack) 11

23 December Blondes Have More Fun (Rod Stewart) 3

1979 
13 January The Singles 1974-1978 (Carpenters) 2

27 January Don't Walk, Boogie (Various) 2

10 February Parallel Lines (Blondie) 8

7 April Barbra Streisand Greatest Hits Vol 2 3

28 April The Very Best Of Leo Sayer (Leo Sayer) 4

26 May Breakfast In America (Supertramp) 1

2 June Voules Vous (Abba) 2

16 June Do It Yourself (Ian Dury and The Blockheads) 1

23 June Discovery (Electric Light Orchestra) 4

21 July Replicas (Tubeway Army) 3

11 August The Best Disco Album In The World (Various) 3

1 September I Am (Earth Wind and Fire) 1

8 September Discovery (Electric Light Orchestra) 2

22 September In Through The Out Door (Led Zeppelin) 2

6 October The Pleasure Principle (Gary Numan) 3

27 October Regetta De Blanc (Police) 4

24 November Tusk (Fleetwood Mac) 1

1 December Greatest Hits Vol 2 (Abba) 3

22 December The Wall (Pink Floyd) 3

1980 
12 January Greatest Hits Vol 2 (Abba) 1

19 January The Wall (Pink Floyd) 1

26 January Regatta De Blanc (Police) 1

2 February The Pretenders (Pretenders) 4

1 March The Last Dance (Various) 1

8 March Get Happy (Elvis Costello and The Attractions) 3

29 March Tell Me On A Sunday (Marti Webb) 1

5 April Tears and Laughter (Johnny Mathis) 1

12 April 12 Gold Bars (Status Quo) 1

19 April Duke (Genesis) 2

# From 3 May to 7 June 1980 paper hit by industrial action.  

7 June Sky 2 (Sky) 1

14 June I just Can't Stop It (The Beat) 1

21 June Peter Gabriel (Peter Gabriel) 2  

5 July Peter Gabriel * (Peter Gabriel)

Flesh and Blood* (Roxy Music) =1

12 July Flesh and Blood (Roxy Music) 1

19 July Emotional Rescue (Rolling Stones) 4

16 August Closer (Joy Division) 1

23 August Back In Black (AC/DC) 2

6 September Flesh and Blood (Roxy Music) 1

13 September Drama (Yes) 1

20 September Telekon (Gary Numan) 1

27 September Signing Off (UB40) 1

4 October Scary Monsters and Super Creeps (David Bowie) 2

18 October Zenyatta Mondatta (Police) 4

15 November Guilty (Barbra Streisand) 3

6 December Supertrouper (Abba)

1981 
10 January Double Fantasy (John Lennon) 3

31 January Kings of The Wild Frontier (Adam and The Ants) 3

21 February Double Fantasy (John Lennon) 1

28 February Face Value (Phil Collins) 6

11 April Face Dances (Who) 2

25 April Sky 3 (Sky) 1

2 May Come and Get It (Whitesnake) 1

9 May Future Shock (Gillan) 1

16 May Kings of The Wild Frontier (Adam and The Ants) 2

30 May Wha’ Appen? (Beat) 2

13 June Stars on 45 (Starsound) 1

20 June Present Arms (UB40) 3

11 July No Sleep `Till Hammersmith (Motorhead) 3

1 August Secret Combination (Randy Crawford) 3

22 August Time (Electric Light Orchestra) 4

19 September Tattoo You (Rolling Stones) 2

3 October Dead Ringer (Meatloaf) 1

10 October Abacab (Genesis) 1

17 October Ghost In The Machine (Police) 3

7 November Dare (Human League) 2

21 November Queens Greatest Hits (Queen) 7

1982 
9 January Dare (Human League) 7

27 February Love Songs (Barbra Streisand) 3

20 March Pelican West (Haircut 100) 2

3 April The Gift (Jam) 1

10 April Love Songs (Barbra Streisand) 3

1 May Pelican West (Haircut 100) 1

8 May 1982 (Status Quo) 1

15 May Complete Madness (Madness) 3

5 June Rio (Duran Duran) 2

19 June Avalon (Roxy Music) 4

17 July The Lexicon of Love (ABC) 3

7 August Fame (Soundtrack) 1

14 August The Kids From Fame (Various) 1

21 August Too-Rye-Ay (Dexy's Midnight Runners) 3

11 September The Kids From Fame (Various) 1

18 September Upstairs At Eric's (Yazoo) 3

9 October Love Over Gold (Dire Straits) 5

13 November Kissing To Be Clever (Culture Club) 1

20 November Singles – 45's and Over (Squeeze) 1

27 November Hello; I Must Be Going (Phil Collins) 2

11 December The Singles: The First Ten Years (ABBA) 4

1983 
8 January The John Lennon Collection (John Lennon) 3

29 January Business as Usual (Men at Work) 4

26 February Porcupine (Echo and the Bunnymen) 1

5 March Business as Usual (Men at Work) 1

12 March Thriller (Michael Jackson) 1

19 March War (U2) 2

2 April The Hurting (Tears for Fears) 2

16 April The Final Cut (Pink Floyd) 1

23 April Lets Dance (David Bowie) 4

21 May True (Spandau Ballet) 3

11 June Thriller (Michael Jackson) 1

18 June Lets Dance (David Bowie) 1

25 June Synchronicity (The Police) 4

23 July Fantastic (Wham!) 1

30 July You and Me Both (Yazoo) 1

6 August No Parlez (Paul Young) 3

27 August Punch the Clock (Elvis Costello) 1

3 September 18 Greatest Hits (Michael Jackson & The Jackson Five) 1

10 September Fantastic (Wham!) 1

17 September Flick of The Switch (AC/DC) 1

24 September Standing In the Light (Level 42) 1

1 October Labour of Love (UB40) 2

15 October No Parlez (Paul Young) 1

22 October Genesis (Genesis) 1

29 October Colour by Numbers (Culture Club) 4

26 November Can't Slow Down (Lionel Richie) 1

3 December Undercover (Rolling Stones) 1

10 December Seven and the Ragged Tiger (Duran Duran) 1

17 December Under a Blood Red Sky (U2) 1

24 December No Parlez (Paul Young) 4

1984 
21 January Thriller (Michael Jackson) 2

4 February Under a Blood Red Sky (U2) 1

11 February Touch (The Eurythmics) 2

25 February Sparkle In The Rain (Simple Minds) 1

3 March Into The Gap (Thompson Twins) 3

24 March Humans Lib (Howard Jones) 3

14 April Can't Slow Down (Lionel Richie) 5

19 May Ocean Rain (Echo and The Bunnymen) 1

26 May Legend (Bob Marley & The Wailers) 7

21 July Parade (Spandau Ballet) 1

28 July Legend (Bob Marley & The Wailers) 2

11 August Diamond Life (Sade) 4

8 September Now That's What I Call Music 3 (Various) 3

29 September The Woman In Red (Soundtrack) 2

13 October Tonight (David Bowie) 1

20 October The Unforgettable Fire (U2) 3

10 November Welcome To The Pleasuredome (Frankie Goes to Hollywood) 2

24 November Make It Big (Wham!) 3

15 December The Hits Album (Various) 5

1985 
19 January Alf (Alison Moyet) 2

2 February Agent Provocateur (Foreigner) 3

23 February Born In The USA (Bruce Springsteen) 1

2 March No Jacket Required (Phil Collins) 5

6 April The Secret of Association (Paul Young) 4

4 May Songs From The Big Chair (Tears Fears) 2

18 May Be Yourself Tonight (The Eurythmics) 2

1 June Brothers In Arms (Dire Straits) 2

15 June Our Favourite Shop (Style Council) 1

22 June Boys and Girls (Bryan Ferry) 2

6 July Misplaced Childhood (Marillion) 1

13 July Born In The USA (Bruce Springsteen) 4

10 August Brothers In Arms (Dire Straits) 2

24 August Now That's What I Call Music Now 5 (Various) 5

28 September Hounds of Love (Kate Bush) 6

9 November Once Upon A Time (Simple Minds) 1

16 November Afterburner (ZZ Top) 1

23 November Promise (Sade) 3

14 December Now That's What I Call Music 6 (Various) 5

1986 
18 January Brothers In Arms (Dire Straits) 8

15 March King of America (The Costello Show) 1

22 March Brothers In Arms (Dire Straits) 3

12 April Hits 4 (Various) 2

26 April Parade (Prince and the Revolution) 1

3 May Street Life – 20 Greatest Hits (Bryan Ferry and Roxy Music) 5

7 June So (Peter Gabriel) 2

21 June A Kind of Magic (Queen) 1

28 June Invisible Touch (Genesis) 2

12 July True Blue (Madonna) 7

30 August Dancing on the Ceiling (Lionel Richie) 1

6 September Now That's What I Call Music 7 (Various) 3

27 September Graceland (Paul Simon) 1

4 October Break Every Rule (Tina Turner) 1

11 October Graceland (Paul Simon) 6

22 November Every Breath You Take –The Singles (The Police) 1

29 November Bruce Springsteen & Street Band Live 1975-85 1

6 December The Whole Story (Kate Bush) 2

20 December Now That's What I Call Music 8 (Various) 4

1987 
17 January The Whole Story (Kate Bush) 3

7 February Graceland (Paul Simon) 3

28 February The Phantom of the Opera (Various) 3

21 March The Joshua Tree (U2) 5

25 April Raindancing (Alison Moyet) 2

9 May The Joshua Tree (U2) 1

16 May Keep Your Distance (Curiosity Killed The Cat) 1

23 May Solitude Standing (Suzanne Vega) 1

30 May It's Better To Travel (Swing Out Sister) 1

6 June Live In the City of Light (Simple Minds) 2

20 June Whitney (Whitney Houston) 5

25 July Introducing the Hardline-According To (Terrance Trent D’Arby) 3

15 August The Hits Album 6 (Various) 3

5 September Hysreria (Def Leppard) 1

12 September Bad (Michael Jackson) 6

24 October Tunnel of Love (Bruce Springsteen) 1

31 October Nothing Like The Sun (Sting) 3

21 November Faith (George Michael) 1

28 November All The Best (Paul McCartney) 1

5 December Whenever You Need Somebody (Rick Astley) 1

12 December Now That's What I Call Music 10 (Various) 6

1988 
23 January Popped In, Souled Out (Wet, Wet, Wet) 1

30 January Introducing the Hardline, According To (Terrance Trent D’Arby) 1

6 February If I Should Fall From Grace (The Pogues) 1

13 February Introducing the Hardline, According To (Terrance Trent D’Arby) 5

19 March Little Children (Mission) 1

26 March Viva Hate (Morrisey) 2

9 April Now That's What I Call Music 11 (Various) 2

23 April Push (Bros) 1

30 April Seventh Son of a Seventh Son (Iron Maiden) 1

References 

Melody Maker